Claude Burton Hutchison (April 9, 1885 – August 25, 1980) was a botanist, agricultural economist, educator, and Mayor of the City of Berkeley, California from 1955 to 1963.

Hutchison was born on April 9, 1885, in Livingston County near Chillicothe, Missouri, the son of farmer William Moses Hutchison and his wife Ada Smith.  He married Roxie Pritchard in 1908. They obtained their marriage license in Gallatin, Daviess County, Missouri.  They were the parents of at least five children.

Hutchison was educated at the University of Missouri where he was also a founding member of FarmHouse fraternity. He held teaching positions at the University of Missouri and Cornell University.  At Cornell he taught genetics to Barbara McClintock. Hutchison left Cornell for the University of California, Davis where he was Professor of Agriculture from 1922 to 1952; Dean of the College of Agriculture from 1922 to 1925; and Vice President, University of California (system wide) from 1945 to 1952. When he left UC Davis he served as Dean of Agriculture at the University of Nevada until his retirement in 1954. From 1955 to 1963 he served as mayor of Berkeley, California.

In the 1920s, Hutchison went to Europe, serving as Director of Agricultural Education for the International Education Board in Paris.  In the 1930s he was a director of the Giannini Foundation of Agricultural Economics.

Hutchison Hall on the campus of the University of California at Davis is named for him. He was also a member of Alpha Phi Omega, Iota Phi chapter

Hutchison died August 25, 1980, at the age of 95.

His son Claude B. Hutchison Jr., a retired U.S. Navy Captain, ran and lost against Congressman Ron Dellums in the 1980s.  In November 2006, he was an appointee of the Bush Administration serving in the Department of Veterans Affairs.

References

Sources

 US Census, New York, Tompkins County, 1920

External links
Claude B. Hutchison Papers at Special Collections Dept., University Library, University of California, Davis
 Photos of Claude Hutchison, from the UCD Library Special Collections
Giannini Hall 75th Anniversary
President to Appoint Claude B. Hutchison, Jr.

Mayors of Berkeley, California
Scientists from California
20th-century American educators
American botanists
University of Missouri alumni
University of Missouri faculty
1885 births
1980 deaths
FarmHouse founders
University of California, Davis faculty
20th-century American politicians
People from Chillicothe, Missouri